Āria is a rural community in the Waitomo District and Waikato region of New Zealand's North Island.

The area experienced severe flooding in September 2017.

History 
Four small mines produced 53,000 tons from Aria coalfield between 1917 and 1961. To the east of Āria a lime quarry opened in the 1960s. A new post office opened in 1922 and there was a butter factory from about 1911.

Demographics

Āria had a population of 1,290 at the 2018 New Zealand census, an increase of 96 people (8.0%) since the 2013 census, and a decrease of 69 people (−5.1%) since the 2006 census. There were 462 households, comprising 654 males and 636 females, giving a sex ratio of 1.03 males per female. The median age was 35.8 years (compared with 37.4 years nationally), with 324 people (25.1%) aged under 15 years, 237 (18.4%) aged 15 to 29, 567 (44.0%) aged 30 to 64, and 165 (12.8%) aged 65 or older.

Ethnicities were 76.5% European/Pākehā, 36.3% Māori, 1.4% Pacific peoples, 1.4% Asian, and 0.9% other ethnicities. People may identify with more than one ethnicity.

The percentage of people born overseas was 8.4, compared with 27.1% nationally.

Although some people chose not to answer the census's question about religious affiliation, 58.1% had no religion, 25.1% were Christian, 4.7% had Māori religious beliefs, 0.2% were Hindu, 0.2% were Muslim, 0.2% were Buddhist and 1.2% had other religions.

Of those at least 15 years old, 126 (13.0%) people had a bachelor's or higher degree, and 225 (23.3%) people had no formal qualifications. The median income was $29,900, compared with $31,800 nationally. 108 people (11.2%) earned over $70,000 compared to 17.2% nationally. The employment status of those at least 15 was that 513 (53.1%) people were employed full-time, 210 (21.7%) were part-time, and 30 (3.1%) were unemployed.

Āria community is in meshblocks 1014500, 1014600, 1014900 and 1015000, which had a population of 129 in the 2018 census.

Education

References

External links 

 1957 aerial view of Aria

Waitomo District
Populated places in Waikato